In the first edition of the tournament, Thomas Muster won the title by defeating Carlos Costa 6–2, 6–4 in the final.

Seeds

Draw

Finals

Top half

Bottom half

References

External links
 Official results archive (ATP)
 Official results archive (ITF)

Abierto Mexicano - Singles